Waskow is a surname. Notable people with the surname include:

Arthur Waskow (born 1933), American author, political activist, and rabbi
Dieter Waskow (born 1957), German diver 
Henry T. Waskow (1918–1943), American World War II captain
Thomas C. Waskow (born 1947), American Air Force officer